Stackhousia stratfordiae is a species of plant in the family Celastraceae.

The species is found in a few scattered locations in the Goldfields-Esperance region of Western Australia.

References

stratfordiae
Plants described in 2011
Taxa named by William Robert Barker